The Rhine-Main Transport Association (Rhein-Main-Verkehrsverbund) has given unique numbers to its regional railway services in regular operation. Rhine-Main S-Bahn lines have a single digit with an "S" prefix, as is standard in Germany, while the remaining lines have two-digit numbers, preceded by two letters indicating the train class: "RB" (Regionalbahn) and "RE" (Regional-Express). The lines are mainly run to and from Frankfurt as the metropolis of the Rhine-Main region, but there are also a number of connecting lines between the major towns of the whole area.

External links 
 

Regional rail in Germany
Transport in Hesse